The 2019 NAB AFL Women's Under-18 Championships was played between May and July 2019, with six teams competing in the main 'Series 2' round-robin tournament and with a further four playing in a two-match one-on-one exhibition as the competition's initial 'Series 1' tournament.

Format
The competition was opened with 'Series 1', a set of closed competitions between four pairs of teams representing the country's eight largest states and territories. In 'Series 2', teams representing Vic Country, Vic Metro, Queensland and Western Australia were joined by Central and Eastern Allies teams representing teams of the combined regions of Northern Territory and South Australia (Central) as well as New South Wales, ACT and Tasmania (Eastern). Each team played a total of three matches in that series.

Vic Metro finished the round-robin 'Series 2' as the only team undefeated in that series, making them the de facto tournament winners. The competition's best player award was won by Vic Metro's Georgia Patrikios.

Fixture

Series 1

Series 2

All-Australian team
The 2019 Women's All-Australian team was selected by a panel of experts, including the AFL's Brett Munro and AFL Women's club list managers Katrina Gill (Adelaide), Wade Spilcker (Fremantle), Rhys Harwood (North Melbourne), and Ben Waller (Geelong).

Team MVPs
At the conclusion of the tournament, each competing team named their best player for the tournament. The winner of these 'most valuable player' awards are as follows:

References

2019
2019 in Australian rules football
2019 in Australian women's sport